Justin Tyler Berfield (born February 25, 1986) is an American retired actor, writer, and producer. He is known for his portrayal of Malcolm's dimwitted older brother, Reese, on the family sitcom Malcolm in the Middle. He also played Ross Malloy on The WB sitcom Unhappily Ever After. As of 2010, Berfield is Chief Creative Officer of Virgin Produced, a film and television development, packaging, and production company announced in 2010 by the Virgin Group.

Early life
Berfield was born in Agoura Hills, California, to Gail Berfield (née Stark) and Eric "Rick" Berfield. He is the younger brother of actor Lorne Berfield. Berfield is Jewish.

Acting career
Berfield's first screen appearance was in a Folgers coffee commercial at age five. He went on to appear in 20 other nationally broadcast American commercials as a young child. His TV debut came in the short-lived series The Good Life (1994) in which he co-starred with Drew Carey. More TV appearances followed in Hardball, The Boys Are Back, and The Mommies (1994–1995).

Berfield's first long-running TV role was as Ross Malloy in Unhappily Ever After (1995–1999), in which he notched up 100 episode appearances. In 1995, he (then aged 9) was one of 3000 juvenile actors who auditioned for the role of the young Anakin Skywalker in Star Wars: Episode I – The Phantom Menace.

In 1999, Linwood Boomer cast Berfield to play Reese, the trouble-making older brother of Frankie Muniz's title character on the Fox sitcom Malcolm in the Middle (in reality, Berfield is nearly 3 months younger than Muniz), which premiered on January 9, 2000. He appeared in all 151 episodes of that series, and with the recording of the 100th episode became the youngest actor in screen history to have appeared in 100 episodes of two different TV series. After Malcolm in the Middle ended on May 14, 2006, Berfield concentrated on production work, although he made a one-off appearance in the series Sons of Tucson in 2010.

Charity work
In 2001, Berfield was asked to serve as a National Youth Ambassador for Ronald McDonald House Charities, in which he participated for three years until turning 18. He has been active with St. Jude Children's Research Hospital and most recently Virgin Unite, the charitable arm of Virgin Group.

Personal life 
Berfield has a daughter with his wife Liza.

Filmography

Film

Television

Awards

References

External links
 
 

1986 births
Living people
20th-century American Jews
20th-century American male actors
21st-century American Jews
21st-century American male actors
American film producers
American male child actors
American male film actors
American male television actors
American male voice actors
Film producers from California
Jewish American male actors
Jewish American writers
Male actors from Los Angeles
Male actors from Santa Monica, California
People from Agoura Hills, California
Television producers from California
Jewish American television producers
Jewish American film producers